Battipaglia is a municipality (comune) in the province of Salerno, Campania, south-western Italy.

Famed as a production place of buffalo mozzarella, Battipaglia is the economic hub of the Sele plain.

History
Formerly part of the ancient Greek colonies of the Magna Graecia, the municipal area used to host strategic Roman settlements during the late Republican-early Imperial times, like most of the southern Tyrrhenian coast. Archaeological excavations have brought to light several finds dating back to as early as the 3rd century BC pertaining to at least two villas. One of those was located in the vicinity of the coastline and was part of a larger thermal complex. The other was positioned internally and likely served as a productive belt between cereal crops in the plain and olive crops and vineyards on the hill.

The town was first given its modern name in 1080 within a bureaucratic document of the Duchy of Apulia and Calabria addressed to the local Catholic diocese. It is generally believed that the name Battipaglia is formed by the union of batti (to thresh) and paglia (to straw), owing to the activity of peasants in the past. However, some scholars have hypothesized that the name could have originated from Baptipalla, indicating a place devoted to Voltumna, a chthonic Etruscan deity.
 
Battipaglia as a definite township was formally created by Ferdinand II of the Two Sicilies in 1858, as the Bourbon authorities designated the place as the site of an agricultural colony where families who had survived the 1857 Basilicata earthquake could be rehoused. It was eventually granted the status of independent municipality by a Royal Decree on March 28, 1929 (during the Mussolini Cabinet), comprising parts of the territories which had been previously included in the nearby towns of Eboli and Montecorvino Rovella.

In 1943, during World War II, the town suffered heavy bombing by Allied air force, resulting in 117 civilian casualties. Although most of the town had been razed to the ground, in the aftermath of the conflict Battipaglia was to be rebuilt remarkably quickly, even attracting migrants from the hinterland seeking work. The town thus experienced an outstanding increase in population between 1951 and 1960, turning into a dynamic industrial area. In 1953, Battipaglia went under the media spotlight as its socialist mayor, Lorenzo Rago, was kidnapped never to be found again.

In 1969, due to the scheduled shutdown of two large sugar and tobacco processing factories — both employing a significant number of locals — thousands of Battipagliesi carried out widespread riots, which would be calmed down few days later following the Italian government's commitment to keep both operational. The few but intense days of social unrest — which took place in the context of a wider protest movement by students and workers in Italy and several other Western countries — eventually resulted in two fatalities.

Since the late 20th and early 21st century, the agricultural sector has been joined by the industrial one, several companies having established factories in the city.

Geography
The municipality borders with Bellizzi, Eboli, Montecorvino Rovella, Olevano sul Tusciano and Pontecagnano Faiano. Its hamlets (frazioni) are Aversana, Belvedere, Fasanara, Lago, Padova, San Emilio, Santa Lucia Inferiore, Spineta, Tavernola, Verdesca, and Vivai.

Demographics

Population
The first migration wave, beginning in the nineteenth century, led many people to move to Battipaglia from Melfi and neighboring municipalities. During the 1960s, the local population soared due to the influx of immigrants from bordering areas (including the towns of the Monti Picentini, Campagna, the valley of the Sele and Cilento), mainly because of the job opportunities in the town's industry. Over the last three decades, the aforementioned have been joined by other groups, mainly eastern European, northern African and southern Asian expats.

Economy
Most of the town's wealth is due to the industrial, craft, and agricultural sectors.

A large number of local dairy companies produce the well-known local buffalo mozzarella (Mozzarella di bufala campana DOP), a famous form of which is called zizzona di Battipaglia (Battipaglia boob) because of its similarity to a female breast.

In addition to that, Battipaglia is a production area of Carciofo di Paestum (Paestum artichoke) IGP, annurca IGP, and tomato Fiaschello.

Among the most significant companies which established factories in Battipaglia are: Bonduelle (food), Prysmian (telecommunications cables), Sivam (animal husbandry), Cooper Standard Automotive (car parts), Nexans (electric cables), and Deriblok (packaging).

Culture
Every first Sunday of July the town's center is decked to the nines for three days on the occasion of the celebrating of Our Lady of Hope (Festa della Speranza). The big town market, whose atmosphere recalls an amusement park where traders can display their wares, lasts from Saturday to Monday, usually ending with a music exhibition in the central Piazza Amendola.

Education
Battipaglia houses a number of secondary schools, both public and private:
Liceo scientifico, classico and linguistico "Enrico Medi"
 Istituto di Istruzione Superiore "Besta-Gloriosi" (istituto tecnico)
 Istituto di Istruzione Superiore "Enzo Ferrari" (istituto professionale)
 Istituto professionale per l'agricoltura Salerno
 Liceo scientifico e tecnico "Giacomo Leopardi" (private school)
 Istituto "Merini" (private school)
 Istituto "Robert Kennedy" (private school)

Media

Press 
 Nero su Bianco (bi-weekly)
 Battipaglia 1929 (online news outlet)
 Battipaglia News (online news outlet)

TV & radio
 RCS75 - Radio Castelluccio (radio)
 SeiTV (TV channel)
 Sud TV (TV channel)

Literature
L. Rocco Carbone, Battipaglia, 70 anni nella sua storia, Massa Editore (1999).

See also
A.S.D. Battipagliese

References

External links

 Battipaglia official website
 Battipaglia Online website

 
Cities and towns in Campania
Populated places established in 1929